Ione may refer to:

Places 

 Ione, California, a city
 Ione, Colorado, an unincorporated community
 Ione, Nevada, an unincorporated community
 Ione, Oregon, a city
 Ione, Washington, a town
 Ionopolis or Ione, an ancient town near Antioch

People 

 Ione Band of Miwok Indians, a federally recognized tribe in California
 Ione Christensen (born 1933), Canadian politician
 Ione Virginia Hill Cowles (1858-1940), American clubwoman, social leader
 Ione Wood Gibbs (c. 1871–1923), American educator, journalist, and clubwoman
 Ione Grogan (1891–1961), American academic and educator
 Ione Skye (born 1970), British-American actress

Other uses 
 Tropical Storm Ione (disambiguation), one Atlantic and several Pacific Ocean hurricanes, storms and typhoons
 Ione (plant), a genus of orchids
 Ione (isopod), a genus of isopod in the family Bopyridae
 Ione (mythology), one of the Nereids in Greek mythology

See also
Iona (disambiguation)
Lone (disambiguation)